Raiders of the Lost Ark: Original Motion Picture Soundtrack is the film score to the 1981 Steven Spielberg film, Raiders of the Lost Ark. The music was composed and conducted by John Williams, and performed by the London Symphony Orchestra. Orchestrations were done by Herbert W. Spencer with additional orchestrations done by Al Woodbury. The score was released by Columbia Records in June 1981. The soundtrack received an Academy Award nomination for Best Original Score, but lost out to Vangelis' score for Chariots of Fire.

Composition
Williams said that the music did not have to be serious for the film and was instead theatrical and excessive. Williams spent a few weeks working on the Indiana Jones theme, more commonly known as "The Raiders March" that plays during the main character's heroic scenes. Two separate pieces were played for Spielberg, who wanted to use both. These pieces became the main theme and musical bridge of "The Raiders March".

For the romantic theme, Williams took inspiration from older films like the drama Now, Voyager (1942) to create something more emotionally monumental that he felt would contrast well with the film's humor and lighter moments. Williams used "dark" orchestral pieces to represent the actions of the Nazis, using the "seventh degree on the scale of the bottom". He said this signified a militaristic evil. To create something suitably biblical for the Ark of the Covenant, he used a mix of chorus and orchestra.

Track listing

 "The Raiders March" (a.k.a. "Indiana Jones Theme")
 "Flight from Peru"
 "The Basket Game"
 "The Map Room: Dawn"
 "The Well of the Souls"
 "Desert Chase"
 "Marion's Theme"
 "The Miracle of the Ark"
 "End Credits"

Marion's theme is inspired by the second movement of Rachmaninoff's Piano concerto no.2 op. 18.

Expanded edition
The soundtrack was re-released in an expanded edition by DCC Compact Classics, Inc. in November 1995 on CD and LP, with thirty minutes of new and extended cues and a 24-page booklet. The LP had an extended "The Well of the Souls" sequence that was absent on the CD release.

Track listing

Total Time: 73:35

The Indiana Jones Trilogy
Silva released a newly recorded version of Williams' Indiana Jones music entitled "The Indiana Jones Trilogy" on January 21, 2003. It features various cues from the first three Indiana Jones films, with seven from Raiders. However, although they use the original manuscripts, this is a re-recording performed by the City of Prague Philharmonic Orchestra.

Indiana Jones: The Soundtracks Collection
The five-disc release by Concord Records was released on November 11, 2008. The set contains the three original soundtracks to the trilogy, expanded and remastered, including material never before issued on CD. The box set also includes the standard Kingdom of the Crystal Skull soundtrack (released in May 2008, no bonus material added) plus a bonus CD that includes more music from the trilogy and an exclusive audio interview CD with Williams.

The re-issues of the three original soundtracks are also available in Europe as a single release. The content are identical to the first three titles in the box-set.

Missing music
There are about three minutes of music from Raiders of the Lost Ark that—so far—have not been released on CD.

Marion Into The Pit (Present on DCC LP)
Indy Rides The Statue (Original Film Version—Concord Release is an Alternate)

In addition to the missing music, "Desert Chase" is incomplete on the Concord set. It has been trimmed down to its 1981 album length, making the 1995 release the only complete representation of that cue.

References

Indiana Jones music
1981 soundtrack albums
1980s film soundtrack albums
London Symphony Orchestra soundtracks
PolyGram soundtracks
Columbia Records soundtracks
Grammy Award for Best Score Soundtrack for Visual Media
John Williams soundtracks